The Kentucky Highway Patrol was founded in 1936 when the Division of Highway Patrol was created as a part of the Kentucky State Highway Department.  The Highway Patrol began with 40 officers who enforced traffic laws on Kentucky roads.  By 1948 the Kentucky Highway Patrol had 200 officers.

The 1939-40 Police Blue Book published by the International Association of Chiefs of Police listed 146 employees, 56 patrol cars, and 21 motorcycles for the Kentucky Highway Patrol.

On July 1, 1948, the Kentucky Highway Patrol was abolished due to the passage of the State Police Act, which was promoted by Governor Earle C. Clements. The Kentucky Highway Patrol was replaced by the Kentucky State Police, a new agency whose officers had full police powers, not limited to traffic laws.  The new Kentucky State Police inherited the officers and equipment of the Kentucky Highway Patrol.

Fallen officers 

Six officers died in the line of duty during the Kentucky Highway Patrol's 12-year history.

See also

 List of law enforcement agencies in Kentucky
 State police
 State patrol
 Highway patrol

References

External links
Official Website for the Kentucky State Police

Defunct law enforcement agencies of Kentucky
Government agencies established in 1936
Road law enforcement agencies
Transportation in Kentucky
1936 establishments in Kentucky
1948 disestablishments in Kentucky
Government agencies disestablished in 1948